The ninth and final competition weekend 2012–13 ISU Speed Skating World Cup was held in the Thialf arena in Heerenveen, Netherlands, from Friday, 8 March, until Sunday, 10 March 2013.

Schedule of events
Schedule of the event:

Medal summary

Men's events

Women's events

References

9
Isu World Cup, 2012-13, 9
ISU Speed Skating World Cup, 2012-13, World Cup 9